Rebecca Leslie  is a Canadian ice hockey forward, currently a member of the PWHPA.

Career 
Across four seasons at Boston University, Leslie scored 171 points in 139 games, and captained the team in her final year. In 2018, she signed her first professional contract with the Calgary Inferno of the CWHL, with whom she would win the Clarkson Cup, and was a finalist for rookie of the year. After the CWHL folded, she announced she would join the newly-formed PWHPA.

International 
In 2014, Leslie put up 5 points in 5 games for the Canadian team that won the gold medal in the U18 IIHF Women's World Juniors. In 2019, she made her first senior appearance for Team Canada in the Rivalry Series.

Personal life 
Current AHL player Zac Leslie is her brother.

References

External links
 Biographical information and career statistics from Elite Prospects

1996 births
Living people
Ice hockey people from Ottawa
Canadian women's ice hockey forwards
Professional Women's Hockey Players Association players
Calgary Inferno players
Boston University Terriers women's ice hockey players